Brenton is an English place name and surname. The surname Brenton indicates that one's ancestors came from a place called Brenton near Exminster, Devon, south West England, the original meaning of which was "Bryni's homestead". Bryni was an Old English given name based on the word bryne, "flame".

Brenton is now also used as a given name in English speaking countries. It has been one of the thousand most common names for boys born in the United States since 1966. The name can be commonly found in the United States, Canada, Australia and New Zealand. In Australia it is particularly associated with South Australia, where it has historically been very popular. Its popularity in Australian and the US increased in the 1980s due to the TV miniseries All the Rivers Run, based on the 1958 novel of the same name by Nancy Cato, which contained a character named Brenton Edwards.

Given name
Brenton Adcock, Australian rules footballer
Brenton Bersin (born 1990), American football wide receiver
Brenton Best (born 1963), Australian politician
Brenton Birmingham (born 1972), American-Icelandic basketball player
Brenton Bowen (born 1983), Australian rugby league player
Brenton Broadstock (born 1952), Australian composer
Brenton Brown (born 1973), South African-American Christian musician
Brenton Cabello (born 1981), Spanish swimmer
Brenton Cox Jr. (born 2000), American football player
Brenton Griffiths (born 1991), Jamaican footballer
Brenton Grove (born 1997), Australian racing driver
Brenton Halliburton (1774–1860), Chief Justice of the Nova Scotia Supreme Court
Brenton Harris (born 1969), Australian rules footballer
Brenton G. Hayden, American entrepreneur
Brenton Jones (born 1991), Australian racing cyclist
Brenton Klaebe (born 1966), Australian rules footballer
Brenton Langbein (1928–1993), Australian violinist, composer, and conductor
Brenton Lawrence (born 1984), Australian rugby league player
Brenton Raymond Lewis, Australian physicist
Brenton Miels (1948–1997), Australian rules footballer
Brenton Metzler, American producer
Brenton Parchment (born 1982), West Indian cricketer
Brenton Phillips (born 1962), former Australian rules footballer
Brenton Pomery (born 1973), Australian rugby league player
Brenton Rickard (born 1983), Australian swimmer
Brenton Sanderson (born 1974), former Australian rules footballer
Brenton See, Australian artist
Brenton Spencer, Canadian film and television director
Brenton Tarrant, Australian terrorist
Brenton Thwaites (born 1989), Australian actor
Brenton Vilcins (born 1966), Australian rules footballer
Brenton Weyi (born 1990), American writer
Brenton Wood (born 1941), American singer and songwriter
Brenton G. Yorgason (1945–2016), American novelist

Surname
Edward Brabazon Brenton (1763–1845), lawyer, judge, and  politician in modern-day Canada
Edward Pelham Brenton (1774–1839), British officer of the Royal Navy
Francis Brenton (1927–1971?), British adventurer
Howard Brenton (born 1942), English playwright and screenwriter
James Brenton (1736–1806), British politician and judge in Nova Scotia, modern-day Canada
James Brenton (1740–1782), American Revolutionary War officer
James D. Brenton, British medical scientist
Sir Jahleel Brenton, 1st Baronet, KCB (1770–1844), British admiral
Lancelot Charles Lee Brenton (1807–1862), translator of the Septuagint
Lynn Brenton (1889–1968), American baseball player
Marianne Brenton (1933–2013), American politician
Samuel Brenton (1810–1857), American politician from Indiana
Timothy Brenton (1970–2009), American police officer, murder victim
Tommy Brenton (born 1989), American basketball player
Tony Brenton (born 1950), British diplomat
Will Brenton, British writer and producer
William Brenton (c. 1610–1674), colonial administrator in what is now the United States

See also
Brenton Butler case, case of overturned murder conviction

References

English toponymic surnames